King's Highway 5, commonly referred to as Highway 5 and historically as the Dundas Highway and Governor's Road, is a provincially maintained highway in the Canadian province of Ontario.

Highway5 followed a significant piece of Dundas Street (historically also called The Governor's Road), one of two routes constructed under the orders of John Graves Simcoe during his short tenure as Lieutenant Governor of Upper Canada, the other being Yonge Street. The route was designated as part of the provincial highway system in 1920 and numbered as Highway5 in 1925. Initially it travelled from Toronto to Clappison's Corners before turning south and following what would later become Highway6 south through Hamilton and onwards to Jarvis. It was redirected west from Clappison's Corners to Peters Corners in 1927, and later to Paris in 1931.

Highway5 was quickly engulfed by the growing outer suburbs of Toronto in the 1950s and 1960s, which led to various portions being transferred to local jurisdiction (though still signed as connecting links) over the years. The portions within Metropolitan Toronto were transferred in 1954, followed by portions through Mississauga in 1971, 1978 and 1991. By the 1990s, the provincially-maintained route only extended as far east as Highway 403; it was shortened to its present length in 1998.

Route description 

Highway5 serves as a short connector between Highway8 in the west and Highway6 in the east, and is essentially a continuation of Highway8. This configuration comes as a result of the truncation of both highways by the Ministry of Transportation of Ontario (MTO). The removed sections were transferred to the jurisdiction of the City of Toronto, the City of Mississauga, Halton Region, the City of Hamilton, the County of Brant, and Oxford County on January1, 1998. Prior, Highway5 followed two segments of Dundas Street between Toronto and Paris.

The current route of Highway5 is almost entirely straight and rural. It passes immediately to the north of the Niagara Escarpment, a World Biosphere Reserve. South of the escarpment, at the western tip of Lake Ontario, is the Dundas district of Hamilton, which was once a separate town within the former  Hamilton-Wentworth Region.

Highway5 begins at a roundabout at the southern end of Highway8 and the northern end of former Highway 52 in Peters Corners. To the west, the road is now Hamilton Road5 (which the highway is now designated as beyond both ends of its remaining length through Hamilton). It proceeds westwards towards Paris. Proceeding east, it crosses a ravine, divides a large woodlot and passes through agricultural lands. It crosses Spencer Creek as it approaches Brock Road. Spencer Creek plunges over the nearby escarpment at Webster's Falls. Highway5 then passes through a rural residential area and returns to a farmland setting. It passes through the rural hamlet of Rock Chapel, and then curves to the left on its final approach to Highway6. East of Highway6, the road continues as the eastern section of Hamilton Road 5, and becomes Dundas Street.

The MTO still maintains a  portion of Dundas Street at the Highway407 interchange in Burlington, a  portion at the Highway403 interchange on the Oakville–Mississauga boundary, and a  portion at the Highway427 interchange in Toronto.

History

Predecessors 
Dundas Street is one of the oldest road in Ontario, created before Confederation when the province was known as Upper Canada (a reference to being upstream from Lower Canada on the St. Lawrence River). Under the orders of the first lieutenant governor of Upper Canada, John Graves Simcoe, Captain Samuel Smith led 100 of the Queen's Rangers to open a road from the head of Lake Ontario (now known as Dundas) to La Tranche (later London) in early 1791. The first  from the lakehead to the Grand River—where the Mohawk village that was home to Joseph Brant was located—were blazed by the rangers by October25, 1793. Another  were cleared from the Grand River to the forks of the Thames River by the spring of 1794.

In 1795, Asa Danforth, the namesake of Danforth Avenue, opened a road east to the new town of York (now Toronto). These early trails "involved nothing more than clearing a corridor through the bush, leaving the bigger stumps to rot, often detouring around the really big trees."
The nature of travel in this period meant that daily movement was limited to several miles, and as a result hotels and taverns were established every few miles. Several of these became the seeds of villages, such as Waterdown, Cooksville and Islington.

Designation 

When the Department of Public Highways of Ontario (DPHO) began taking over the responsibility of roads in 1917, it did not assign route numbers. Highways were instead initially referred to by the major cities they connected. What would become Provincial Highway5 during the summer of 1925 was initially known as the Hamilton–Jarvis Highway and the Dundas Highway.
Throughout the summer of 1920, several roads were taken over by the DPHO through Haldimand County, Wentworth County, Halton County, Peel County and York County. Within Haldimand County, the road between Jarvis and north of Caledonia was taken over (or assumed) by the province on June24, 1920. Another set of roads were assumed through Wentworth on July8, connecting with the portion in Haldimand County, through Hamilton to Clappison's Corners and east through Waterdown along Dundas Street. Within Peel, through what is now Mississauga, Dundas Street was assumed on July22. A portion within York County was assumed through Etobicoke from its western boundary as far east as the village of Islington on July29. A final segment of Dundas Street, within Halton from Waterdown to what is now Winston Churchill Boulevard, was assumed on July31.
Portions of the route through Caledonia, Hagersville, Jarvis and Hamilton were not assumed by the DPHO.

Several more segments of road were assumed the following year, including two portions on the outskirts of Toronto. On March16,  of Dundas Street, between Islington Village (at the modern corners of Dundas, Bloor and Kipling) and the Toronto city limits at Jane Street were assumed by the DPHO. On September14, another  of road were assumed along Danforth Avenue, from Sibley Avenue to Kingston Road, via Pinegrove Avenue and Highview Avenue;
Danforth Avenue did not continue east of Warden Avenue at this time, and so the DPHO constructed a new railway overpass and extended the route to Kingston Road, opening in 1925.

Within Wentworth County, the construction of the Clappison Cut through the Niagara Escarpment was underway by 1921, with the aim of bypassing the winding old route that is known today as Old Guelph Road. The new route, which travelled straight along the boundary between East and West Flamboro, was assumed on January12, 1921. The province and the City of Hamilton also constructed several new bridges across Cootes Paradise to create a new northwest entrance into Hamilton. The new entrance, connecting the Toronto–Hamilton Highway (later Highway2) with the incomplete route up the escarpment to Clappison's Corners, was ceremonially opened by the Minister of Public Works and Highways, Frank Campbell Biggs, on August23, 1922.
The Clappison Cut was completed and paved in 1924.

Highway5 and Highway6 travelled concurrently from Highway8 (Main Street) in downtown Hamilton to Clappison's Corners when route numbers were assigned in 1925. This situation was short lived however, as Highway5 was redirected west from Clappison's Corners to Peters Corners to meet Highway8 on May25, 1927. Highway6, in turn, assumed the route of Highway5 south to Jarvis.
The route was extended further west in 1930, when the newly-renamed Department of Highways (DHO) assumed the road from Highway8 at Peters Corners to Highway24 west of St. George, as well as the Governor's Road between Highway24 and Highway2 at Paris. The  road between Highway8 and Highway24, through Beverley and South Dumfries was designated on June18, while the  section of the Governor's Road, along the boundary between South Dumfries and Brantford Township, was designated several months later on September24.
These two segments were connected by a concurrency with Highway24.

Paving and improvements 

When the Hamilton–Jarvis Highway and Dundas Street were assumed by the province, they were paved from Islington village west to Summerville (near Dixie Road), but were otherwise gravel throughout. The route was paved between Mount Hope and Hamilton, between Sixteen Mile Creek and Summerville, as well as along Bloor Street from Islington village to Jane Street in 1921. New bridges were also completed over Sixteen Mile Creek and Mimico Creek.
In 1923, the remainder of the route between Sixteen Mile Creek and Hamilton, including the new Clappison Cut, was paved. This was followed the next year by the construction of a water-bound macadam surface between Jarvis and Caledonia, completing the hard-surfaced road between Jarvis and Hamilton.
That year also saw the completion of a new high-level bridge along Bloor Street over the Humber River, bypassing the old route along Old Mill Road and Old Mill Drive. The bridge was opened ceremoniously by then Minister of Highways—and later premier—George Stewart Henry on November21, 1924.

However, the  paved the entire length between Peters Corners and Clappison's Corners in 1928.
When the province assumed the remainder of the route to Paris, it began paving the highway west from Peters Corners.
another 10km were completed from Troy to Highway24 in 1932, including a railway underpass at St. George.

Within Scarborough, the DHO began a project to widen Kingston Road to a dual highway in the mid 1930s, which would ultimately result in the construction of the first segment of Highway 401. This construction began at the intersection of Highway2 and Highway5 and proceeded northwest. At the intersection of the two highways, the DHO constructed a new grade-separation around the Scarborough Cenotaph beginning in 1936.
the overpass, carrying eastbound traffic from Danforth Avenue onto eastbound Kingston Road, was completed in 1938, though landscaping continued into 1939.
This junction remains in place today, almost unchanged since then.

As suburbanization of Toronto encroached on Toronto Township—which would become the town of Mississauga in 1968—the DHO began to widen Highway5 to four lanes across Peel and Halton in the 1960s, beginning with the section between Highway10 at Cooksville and Mississauga Road in 1961.
In the late 1970s, construction began on Highway403 through Mississauga. As part of this new freeway, an interchange with Highway5 was built just east of Ninth Line, on the Oakville–Mississauga boundary. The interchange opened along with the segment of Highway403 south to the Queen Elizabeth Way at Ford Drive in mid-1981; the freeway was extended north to Erin Mills Parkway on November17th of that year.

Shift of responsibility
Following the creation of Metropolitan Toronto on April 15, 1953,
the new municipality was given responsibility for most of the provincial highways that passed within its boundaries that were not already connecting links following streets urbanized prior to this time. The sections of Highway5 through Etobicoke and Scarborough were accordingly redesignated as connecting links and their maintenance given over to the new Metro government on January15, 1954.
A  portion of Highway5 from Etobicoke Creek west to Mississauga Road was made a connecting link though the recently-established Town of Mississauga on April1, 1970.
Another , between Winston Churchill Boulevard and Mississauga Road in Mississauga, was designated a connecting link on November22, 1978.
on November 27, 1991, a  segment of Dundas Street, from the interchange with Highway403 east to Winston Churchill Boulevard, was made a connecting link through the municipal boundary area between Mississauga and Oakville, and maintenance was transferred to these municipalities.
As the connecting links were technically still part of Highway5, shields continued to be posted along it and marked on the Official Ontario Road Map through Mississauga and Metropolitan Toronto up until 1998 when the highway designation was dropped altogether 

As part of a series of budget cuts initiated by premier Mike Harris under his Common Sense Revolution platform in 1995, numerous highways deemed to no longer be of significance to the provincial network were downloaded to a lower level of government. As it generally served as a local arterial road through the growing suburbs of Oakville and Burlington, Highway5 was downloaded from Highway6 at Clappison's Corners to Highway403, and transferred to the Regional Municipalities of Hamilton–Wentworth and Halton on January1, 1998. On the same day, the portions of the route west of Peters Corners were transferred to Hamilton–Wentworth and the County of Brant. This removed  from the length of the highway, leaving only the portion between Peters Corners and Clappison's Corners in the provincial highway network.

Nonetheless the MTO continues to maintain short segments of Dundas Street (former Highway 5) at interchanges with provincial freeways, including a  portion at Highway403, as well as a  portion at Highway427.

Since 1998 
In July 2001, a new interchange with Highway 407 ETR was opened, connecting the extension of the toll highway with former Highway5 in Burlington.

An operational and safety review of the three intersections at Peters Corners near Hamilton was undertaken in February 2001. Studies, including an environmental assessment were conducted between 2004 and 2009, and settled upon a roundabout as the ideal replacement, with traffic signals at the two intersections with Westover Road (former Highway 52).
Construction began in the spring of 2012, and the C$6.3 million roundabout was opened on September25, 2012.

Major intersections

Former route 
The following table lists cities historically associated with Highway 5 on Ontario's official road maps. Distances are based on the 1930s route.

References
Sources

Bibliography

005
Roads in Hamilton, Ontario